The Gambler's Charm is a 1910 silent short film drama produced by the Lubin Manufacturing Company and distributed through General Film Company.

A print is preserved at the Library of Congress in their collection.

See also
 List of American films of 1910

References

External links
The Gambler's Charm at IMDb.com

1910 films
American silent short films
Lubin Manufacturing Company films
American black-and-white films
1910 short films
1910 drama films
1910s American films
American drama short films